Exit Strategy is the debut album from Astronomy Class and was released on 30 September 2006. It also features collaborations from several prominent Australian MCs and musicians.

Track listing
All tracks written by Shannon Kennedy, Shane Roberts, Chris Hamer-Smith and Maddox unless otherwise noted.
 "Midnight at the Observatory" - 3:18  
 "Rolling Thunder" - 4:06 
 "Vibe Won't Stop" (Kennedy, Roberts, Hamer-Smith, Maddox, Burre) - 3:37
 "Rewind the Tape" (Kennedy, Roberts, Hamer-Smith, Maddox, Harrison) - 4:07
 "Nuthin' Nice" (Kennedy, Roberts, Hamer-Smith, Maddox, Williams) - 3:30 
 "Heatseeker" (Kennedy, Roberts, Hamer-Smith, Maddox, Bennett) - 4:04 
 "After the Carnival" - 3:55   
 "Brink of War Part III" (Kennedy, Roberts, Hamer-Smith, Maddox, Messinger) - 3:50
 "Fight Club" - 3:33
 "Done the Sums" (Kennedy, Roberts, Hamer-Smith, Maddox, Levin) - 4:12
 "A Bright Tomorrow" (Kennedy, Roberts, Hamer-Smith, Maddox, Crowf) - 4:11 
 "No Drop to Drink" (Kennedy, Roberts, Hamer-Smith, Maddox, Tyrrell) - 3:46
 "School Daze" (Kennedy, Roberts, Hamer-Smith, Maddox, Mitchell) - 4:10
 "Exit Strategy" (Kennedy, Roberts, Hamer-Smith, Maddox, Tyrrell) - 4:24
 "Ignition Dub" (Kennedy, Roberts, Hamer-Smith, Maddox, Burnham) - 3:41
 "Heatseeking Dub" (Kennedy, Roberts, Hamer-Smith, Maddox, Burnham) - 4:01
 "Lovers Dub" (Kennedy, Roberts, Hamer-Smith, Maddox, Burnham) - 3:47

Guest artists 
Guest artists on the album include:
 Gina Mitchell (Fbi's Basslines) on "Vibe Won't Stop"
 Lotek (Big Dada) on "Rewind The Tape" and "Heatseeker"
 BVA (Mnemonic Ascent) on "Rewind The Tape"
 Ben Ezra (ESL) and DJ Skoob (NSW DMC Champ) on "Brink of War Part III"
 Hau (Koolism) and Urthboy on "Done the Sums"
 Jane Tyrrell from The Herd on "No Drop To Drink" and "Exit Strategy"

Reviews 

 'In The Mix' album review - Exit Strategy
 Mediasearch Astronomy Class - Exit Strategy (album review)

References 

2006 debut albums
Astronomy Class albums